A gilgai is a small, ephemeral lake formed from a depression in the soil surface in expanding clay soils. Additionally, the term "gilgai" is used to refer to the overall micro-relief in such areas, consisting of mounds and depressions, not just the lakes themselves. The name comes from an Australian Aboriginal word meaning small water hole. Gilgais are found worldwide wherever cracking clay soils and pronounced wet and dry seasons are present. Gilgais are also called "melonholes, crabholes, hogwallows or puff and shelf formations".

Gilgais are thought to form in vertisols through repeated cycles of swelling of the clay when wet and subsequent shrinkage upon drying. This action, known as argillipedoturbation, causes the soil to crack when dry and loose soil material then fills these cracks. When the soil swells upon subsequent re-wetting the soil pressure cannot be dispersed into the now-full cracks and the soil is forced sideways causing a mound to form between cracks and a depression to form at the location of the crack. The process is then further exaggerated by the depressions holding water and thus becoming wetter and swelling more than the mounds, causing even greater shrinkage and cracking. In addition, the cracks channel water deeply into the soil causing even greater swelling and subsequent cracking of the depression areas. Each cycle of swelling, shrinkage and cracking becomes more exaggerated and the landscape eventually becomes covered by a repeated pattern of mounds and depressions. The depressions hold surface water during the wet seasons.

Australia has an abundance of cracking clay soils and a large areas dominated by very pronounced wet and dry seasons providing ideal circumstances for the formation of gilgais. Areas outside Australia that also have the necessary conditions for gilgai formation include central Russia and several parts of the United States, including South Dakota and Texas. Gilgais are structurally similar to the patterned ground of frigid regions, however periglacial soil polygons are formed by repeated freeze-thaw cycles rather than the soil moisture cycles that create gilgai.

Gilgais were an important source of water for Indigenous Australians and enabled people to seasonally forage over areas that lacked permanent water. Similarly, they allowed the stock of early Australian pastoralists to seasonally graze these areas. The introduction of water wells and pumps has reduced the value of gilgais to humans as a source of water. Gilgais are now generally considered a nuisance by farmers. The movement of soil associated with gilgai formation damages infrastructure including building foundations, roads and railway lines and the undulations produced interfere with crop harvesting. The presence of seasonal water in grazing land makes it more difficult to control stock and provides a water supply for "vermin" such as feral pigs and kangaroos.

Gilgais remain of great ecological significance as a source of water for animal and plant life. Crayfish burrow in the wet basins and ants build up the mounds, magnifying the formations through bioturbation.

See also

 Mima mound

References

Further reading
Alekseeva, T.V. & Alekseev, A.O. 1997 "Clay mineralogy and organization of finely dispersed material of gilgai soils (Stavropol Krai)" Eurasian soil science 30:8 867-876

Beckmann, G. G., Thompson, C. H., and B. R. Richards. 1984. Relationships of soil layers below gilgai in black earths. In J. W. McGarity, E. H. Hoult and H. B. So (eds.) The Properties and Utilization of Cracking Clay Soils.  Reviews in Rural Science no. 5. Armidale, NSW, University of New England, pp. 64–72.
Costin, A. B. 1955a. A note on gilgaies and frost soils. Journal of Soil Science 6: 32–34.
Hallsworth, E. G. and G. G. Beckmann. 1969. Gilgai in the Quaternary. Soil Science 107: 409–420.
Hallsworth, E. G., Robertson, G. K., and F. R. Gibbons. 1955. Studies in pedogenesis in New South Wales. VII. The ‘‘gilgai” soils. Journal of Soil Science 6: 1–31.
Jensen, H. I. 1911. The nature and origin of gilgai country. Proceedings of the Royal Society. NSW 45: 337–358
Knight, M. J. 1980. Structural analysis and mechanical origins of gilgai at Boorook, Victoria, Australia. Geoderma 23: 245–283 .
McManus, K. 1999 "Mound Theory, Gilgai and PSD Analysis" Proceeding, 8th Annual Australia and New Zealand Conference on Geomechanics, Hobart
Ollier, C. D. 1966. Desert gilgai. Nature 212: 581–583.
Paton, T. R. 1974. Origin and terminology for gilgai in Australia. Geoderma 11: 221–242.
Stephen, I., Bellis, E., and A. Muir. 1956. Gilgai phenomena in tropical black clays of Kenya. Journal of Soil Science 1–9.
White, E. M. and R. G. Bonestell. 1960. Some gilgaied soils in South Dakota. Soil Science Society of America Proceedings 24:305–309.
Wilson, J.W. 1964 "Vegetation patterns in an unusual gilgai soil in New South Wales," The Journal of Ecology, 52:2 379-389

Australian English
Lakes

Australian Aboriginal words and phrases